Mansour Fadlallah Azzam (born 1960) is the Minister of Presidential Affairs of Syria.

Early life, education and career
Azzam is a Syrian Druze born in Sweida. He earned a bachelor's degree in French literature from the University of Damascus in 1983, followed by a Diploma in Translation and Arabization in the French language from the same school in 1985. He also earned a Diploma in International Relations from the National Institute of Public Administration in Paris.

In 1994, he took a diplomatic post in the Ministry of Foreign Affairs. From 1995–2000 he worked at the  Embassy of Syria, Washington, D.C. as administrator of cultural affairs and U.S. Congress affairs. From 2000–2002 he was an adviser in the Ministry of Foreign Affairs and Deputy Director of Protocol. From 2003–2008 he was Deputy Director of the Presidency of the ceremony, and then appointed Secretary of the Presidency.

His term as minister of public works ended on 9 February 2013.

Personal life
Azzam is married and has three daughters.

See also
Cabinet of Syria

References

Minister of Presidential Affairs Mansour Fadlallah Azzam, SANA

1960 births
Living people
Damascus University alumni
21st-century Syrian politicians
Syrian Druze
Government ministers of Syria